A buffalo robe is a cured buffalo hide, with the hair left on.  
They were used as blankets, saddles or as trade items by the Native Americans who inhabited the vast grasslands of the Interior Plains. Some were painted with pictographs or Winter counts that depict important events such as epidemics, famines and battles. 

From the 1840s to the 1870s the great demand for buffalo robes in the commercial centres of Montreal, New York, St. Paul and St. Louis was a major factor that led to the near extinction of the species. The robes were used as blankets and padding in carriages and sleighs and were made into Buffalo coats.

Only hides taken in winter between November and March when the furs are in their prime were suitable for buffalo robes.
The summer hides were used to make coverings for tipis and moccasins and had little value to traders.

Gallery

See also
Métis buffalo hunt#Buffalo robe trade
Plains hide painting
Koryaks#Culture

External links
Lakota winter counts
Painted Buffalo Robe
Decorative robes
Buffalo Robe, 1850-1875

References

Bison
Hides (skin)
Indigenous peoples of the Great Plains
Native American clothing
First Nations culture